Simon Easterby (born 21 July 1975 in Harrogate, North Yorkshire) is an Irish former rugby union player. He is currently the defence coach for the Irish national team.

Early life
Easterby's father is English and his mother Irish. He is the younger brother of Guy Easterby, also an Ireland international. He was educated at Ampleforth College in North Yorkshire and was a member of St Hughs house.

Club career
Easterby captained the Scarlets for five consecutive seasons and played more than 50 European games, 201 games (19 tries) for Llanelli and the Scarlets. He had been part of the West Wales region since signing from Leeds Tykes in 1999. In August 2010, Easterby was forced to retire through a knee injury at the age of 35.

International career

Ireland
Easterby made his first international appearance in a Six Nations victory over Scotland at Lansdowne Road in 2000 and then became a regular in the side, being ever-present for the remainder of that Six Nations competition. Easterby then played in all three of the games during the summer tour but he missed all of the following season due to injury and did not return until the game against Scotland in September 2001. After Ireland's defeat, he lost his place but he did win a cap as a replacement against Samoa in November 2001. In 2002 he played a part in the first ten of Ireland's games – eight as a starter – but after that, he lost his place and he did not return until playing in two Tests during the summer tour of 2003 against Tonga and Samoa.

He was virtually ever-present for Ireland since then; he has received in total 65 caps and scored 40 points. Described as the "elder statesman among Ireland's back-row options" in 2007, one newspaper suggested that "[2007] could well be Easterby's last Six Nations campaign" As it turned out, Easterby played in one more Six Nations Championship in 2008, after which he retired from international rugby to concentrate on his club career.

British & Irish Lions
Easterby received a call-up to the 2005 Lions tour to New Zealand, after Lawrence Dallaglio fractured his ankle in the first game of the tour. He forced his way into the Test team and covered himself in glory, including scoring a try in the second Test in Wellington. He took over the leadership duties for the 2005 Autumn series in the absence of injured duo Brian O'Driscoll and Paul O'Connell.
In total he has two British & Irish Lions caps.

Coaching
On retiring, Easterby was officially confirmed as the Scarlets new defence coach and signed a two-year contract with the region and in June 2012, Easterby was confirmed as the new head coach for the Scarlets, following the departure of Nigel Davies to Gloucester.

His long association with the Scarlets came to an end in July 2014 when he was confirmed as Irelands new forwards coach, replacing the outgoing John Plumtree.

Personal life
Easterby is married to Sarra Elgan Rees, the daughter of ex-rugby union player Elgan Rees who played for Neath RFC, Wales and the British & Irish Lions. Former Scarlets and Wales full back Matt Cardey was best man at the wedding. Sarra Elgan Easterby is a TV presenter and a fluent Welsh speaker. Their daughter, Soffia, was born in 2007, and their son, Ffredi, was born in 2009.

In August 2014, Easterby was one of 200 public figures who were signatories to a letter to The Guardian expressing their hope that Scotland would vote to remain part of the United Kingdom in September's referendum on that issue.

References

External links
Simon Easterby IRFU

1975 births
Living people
English people of Irish descent
Irish people of English descent
Rugby union players from Harrogate
Rugby union flankers
Irish rugby union coaches
Irish rugby union players
Ireland international rugby union players
Irish Exiles rugby union players
British & Irish Lions rugby union players from Ireland
Scarlets players
Scarlets coaches
People educated at Ampleforth College
English rugby union coaches
English rugby union players
Citizens of Ireland through descent